The president of the Congress of Deputies is the speaker of the Congress of Deputies, the lower house of the Cortes Generales (the Spanish parliament). The president is elected among the members of the Congress and is, after the king and the prime minister, the highest authority in the Kingdom of Spain.

Although the president share the representation of the Cortes Generales with the president of the Senate, the constitutional functions that are granted to the office in terms of royal countersigning and the election process of the head of government, makes the president of the Congress the de facto leader of the legislative branch. This position is also reinforced by having Spain an asymmetric bicameralism that gives greater prominence to the lower house

The current office was established by the Spanish Constitution of 1978, however, the position has a tradition of more than 200 years, since its creation in 1810 as President of the Cortes of Cádiz.

The current president, of the 14th Cortes Generales (101st since the Cortes of Cádiz) is Meritxell Batet, a member of the Spanish Socialist Workers' Party who represents the electoral district of Barcelona.

Functions 
 The president directs and coordinates the Bureau's action.
 The following functions are the responsibility of the Bureau:
 Adopt as many decisions and measures as are necessary for the organization of work and the internal regime and governments of the Chamber.
 Prepare the Draft Budget of the Congress of Deputies, direct and control its execution and submit to the Plenary House, at the end of each year.
 Order the expenses of the Chamber, without prejudice to the delegations that may agree.
 To qualify, in accordance with the Regulations, the writes and documents of a parliamentary nature, as well as declare the admissibility or inadmissibility of the same.
 Decide the processing of all writes and documents of a parliamentary nature, in accordance with the rules established in these Regulations.
 Schedule the general lines of action of the House, establish the calendar of activities of the Plenary and the Commissions for each session and coordinate the work of its various bodies, all after a hearing of the Board of Spokespersons.
 Any others functions entrusted by this Regulation and those not attributed to a specific body.
 The president of the Congress holds the representation of the Chamber, ensures the smooth running of the projects, directs the debates, maintains the order of the same and orders the payments, without prejudice to the delegations that can be conferred to the position.
 It is incumbent upon the president to comply with and enforce the Regulation, interpreting it in cases of doubt and supplying it in cases of omission. When in the exercise of this supplementary function it was proposed to issue a resolution of a general nature, it must mediate the favorable opinion of the Bureau and the Board of Spokespersons.
 The president also performs all other functions conferred by the Constitution, the laws and these Regulations.

Election 

The speaker or president of the Congress of Deputies is elected during the constitutive session which follows the General Elections of the Kingdom or during the next session following the resignation of the president.

The election of the president needs an absolute majority in the Chamber. If an absolute majority is not reached in the first vote, a second vote is held immediately after the announcement of the results by the temporal president of the Chamber (the elder deputy). The second vote needs only a simple majority  (i.e., more «yes» than «no» votes). Each deputy is free to write the name he wants on his ballot, even if those deputies of the majority group vote for a candidate predefined by their party.

The president's term ends in case of death, resignation, loss of the status of deputy or after the dissolution of the Congress of Deputies, prior to the holding of general elections.

Vice presidents 
The Congress' Standing Rules establishes that there are four vice presidents of the Congress (Part III § 30).  All the vice presidents are elected in a unique voting and the four most voted candidates are elected (Part III § 37).

The main task that the standing orders entrust to the vice presidents is that to replace the president in cases of vacancy, absence or impossibility to exercise. However, the standing orders also give the power to the president to delegated on them other responsibilities (Part III § 33).

When the Board of Spokespersons meet, it is needed that at least one of the four vice presidents are present (Part III § 39).

References

External links 
The President of the Congress of Deputies (from congreso.es)

 
Legislative speakers in Spain